Elías Malpartida Franco (21 July 1844 – 10 August 1922) was a Peruvian politician. He was Minister of Finance in 1883 and in 1895. He was the mayor of Lima from 1914 to 1915 and Prime Minister of Peru from 24 September to 23 December 1912.

References

1844 births
1922 deaths
Mayors of Lima
Prime Ministers of Peru
People from Pasco Region
Peruvian Ministers of Economy and Finance